Carl Edward Kwiatkowski (November 20, 1959 – February 2, 2003) was a political figure in Saskatchewan. He represented Carrot River Valley from 1999 to 2003 in the Legislative Assembly of Saskatchewan as a Saskatchewan Party member.

He was born in Porcupine Plain, Saskatchewan and was educated there. After completing his schooling, he worked in road construction and on oil rigs. In 1982, Kwiatkowski married Leona Kistner. He later was general manager for the Porcupine Opportunities Program and served as president of the Saskatchewan Association of Rehabilitation Centres. Kwiatkowski served three terms as mayor of Porcupine Plain. He was also a justice of the peace. Kwiatkowski died in office at the age of 43. He was found dead in his Carrot River constituency office.

References 

1959 births
2003 deaths
Saskatchewan Party MLAs
Mayors of places in Saskatchewan
21st-century Canadian politicians